Kaizer Motaung Junior (born 8 August 1981) is a South African former professional footballer who played as a striker. Kaizer Jr is currently a sporting director for Kaizer Chiefs F.C.

He is the son of South African soccer legend and Kaizer Chiefs founder Kaizer Motaung.

Early life
Motaung was born to Kaizer and Julegka Motaung in Johannesburg, Gauteng and is one of four children. Motaung attended St. John's College, Johannesburg in Johannesburg and Harrow School in north-west London whose alumni include Winston Churchill and James Blunt. He was an excellent cricketer. In 2000, he opened batting with Middlesex and England player Nick Compton at Harrow vs Eton 163rd clash at Lord's since 1805. In that match, he got a century but the match was called off due to rain. He also played against Graeme Smith who was at King Edward High School. He was once told by Ali Bacher to play cricket. Former international referee David Alleray was his housemaster at Harrow.

Career

Youth
Motaung played for Wits University and Kaizer Chiefs youth academies in South Africa and Chelsea and TSV Munich 1860 juniors in England and Germany. In his time in the Chelsea youth academy in the late 90s and early 2000s he was in the same team with Dean Furman, John Terry and Robert Huth.

Senior
Motaung was promoted to the TSV 1860 Munich reserve team and scored 1 goal in 4 matches in his debut season in the 2001–02 Oberliga Bayern season and then 3 goals in 19 matches in the 2002–03 season totaling 4 goals in 22 matches which all were diving headers. He signed with his father's club in July 2003. He made his debut on 17 December 2003 in a 4–0 win over Zulu Royals under Ted Dumitru. He scored his first goal on 9 June 2004 against Wits University. In the 2006–07 season he was the team's top goalscorer (12 goals) and Player of the Season.

Personal life
He married his girlfriend of nine years, Katherine Heider in Munich in 2012, whom he was secretly engaged with for two years. His best man was former teammate at Kaizer Chiefs and current team manager, Gerald Sibeko. Heider gave birth to Tyler Rhys in 2011.

References

1981 births
Living people
People educated at Harrow School
South African soccer players
TSV 1860 Munich players
TSV 1860 Munich II players
Kaizer Chiefs F.C. players
Association football forwards
Soccer players from Johannesburg